La Caleta is a beach located in the historical center of the city of Cádiz, Spain.  It is a natural harbor by which Phoenicians, Carthaginians and Romans penetrated historically. It is the smallest beach in the city, and is isolated from the others.

In culture 

It runs in between the castles of San Sebastián and Santa Catalina and in front of the faculty of Economic and Enterprise Sciences of the Campus of Cadiz of the university of the same name.

It has been pictured in several films, such as 007: Die Another Day, Alatriste and Manolete.

Natives of Cádiz consider it one of the most emblematic places of their city, and use it as a recurrent song subject during Carnival.

Biodiversity 

Although it is an urban beach, it was a wide range of plants and animals.

References

External links

Photo gallery 
Practical information.

Beaches of Andalusia
Nude beaches
Costa de la Luz
Tourist attractions in Andalusia